Major dam construction started in Iran in the 1950s. Some fourteen large dams were built with the help of foreign engineers and advisors during two decades preceding the Islamic Revolution.

In the post-revolution era, Iran's dam building capacity was significantly strengthened, with some 200 contracting companies, 70 consultant firms and 30 corporations as well as hundreds of hydroelectric manufacturing units having been established inside of Iran in less than three decades. In addition to the necessity of generating electricity, Iran needs dams to effectively control and manage a growing water shortage across the country.

Iran was constructing 88 small and large dams in 2007. On average, close to two billion cubic meters of water are added to the country’s water reserves annually. As of 2010, Iran has constructed 588 dams (big and small), with 137 more under construction and 546 planned.

Major reservoirs and dams in Iran

Alavian Dam
Alqadir Dam
Amir Kabir Dam
Azad Dam
Bust-e gez Dam
Daryan Dam
Dez Dam
Doroodzan Dam
Ashavan Dam
Garan Dam
Gavoshan Dam
Ilam Dam
Iran–Turkmenistan Friendship Dam
Jegin Dam
Jiroft dam
Karun-1 (Shahid Abbaspour) Dam
Karun-2 (Masjed Soleyman) Dam
Karun-3 Dam
Karun-4 Dam
Karkheh dam
Khoda Afarin Dam
Kouhrang 1 Dam
Kouhrang 2 Dam
Lar Dam
Latyan Dam
Mahabad Dam
Mamloo Dam
Marun Dam
Nader Shah dam
Panzadh Khordad Dam
Rudbar Lorestan Dam
Sardasht Dam
Sefidrud (Manjil) Dam
Seimare Dam
Shahid Rajaee (Soleyman Tangeh) Dam
Shahid Talebi Dam
Shamo Dam
Shirvan Dam
Siah Bishe Dams
Silveh Dam
Sivand Dam
Sumbar Dam
Tarik Dam
Upper Gotvand Dam
Zarrine River (Bukan) Dam
Zayandeh River Dam

Under construction
Aras Watershed (Meghri) Dam
Bakhtiari Dam
Khersan-3 Dam
Kouhrang 3 Dam

Ancient dams
Band-e Kaisar
Boz Dam
Jaber Dam
Jawid Dam
Kebar Dam
Kurit Dam
Shahi Dam
The Great Hagi Jaffar Dam

International projects

One of Iran’s most important international projects will see the construction of a $200-million hydroelectric dam in Nicaragua starting 2011. Iran is currently engaged in dam construction in Tajikistan, Armenia and Azerbaijan, and consultations are underway with a number of other countries. Kenya, Sri Lanka, Bolivia and Mali are the potential target markets being considered for exporting the country’s technical and engineering services. In 2010, Iran won a contract to build a dam in Afghanistan and the third contract to build a power plant station in Syria.

See also
Irrigation in Iran
Industrial Development and Renovation Organization of Iran
International rankings of Iran
List of power stations in Iran
Water supply and sanitation in Iran

References

External links
 List of reservoirs and dams in Iran

Dams
Iran, Dams and reservoirs of
Dams
Dams